Joshua Ernest Swindell (July 5, 1883 – March 19, 1969) was a Major League Baseball pitcher who played for two seasons. He pitched in four games for the Cleveland Naps during the 1911 Cleveland Naps season, and made an appearance as a pinch hitter during the 1913 Cleveland Naps season.

External links

1883 births
1969 deaths
Major League Baseball pitchers
Cleveland Naps players
Baseball players from Kansas
People from Butler County, Kansas
Winston-Salem Twins players